Amadou Macky Diop (born 17 August 1995) is a Senegalese footballer.

Career

Diambars
Diop began his career with Senegalese side Diambars, joining their academy aged 13-years old. During his time with Diambars, Diop spent a season on loan with Dinamo Zagreb.

Radford University
Diop moved to the United States to play college soccer at Radford University, where he scored 13 goals and tallied 5 assists in 16 appearances.

While at college, Diop also appeared for USL League Two amateur side New York Red Bulls U23.

Atlanta United 2
On 19 November 2019, it was announced that Diop would sign for USL Championship side Atlanta United 2 ahead of their 2020 season. He made his debut for Atlanta on 11 July 2020, appearing as a 69th-minute substitute in a 2-1 loss against the Tampa Bay Rowdies. Diop scored his first and second goals for Atlanta on July 30, 2020, during a 4-3 victory over Miami FC. Diop was released by Atlanta following the 2021 season.

Birmingham Legion
On 9 December 2021, it was announced that Diop would join USL Championship side Birmingham Legion ahead of their 2022 season. Diop made his debut for Birmingham on March 13, 2022 during a 1-1 draw with the Tampa Bay Rowdies. He scored his first and only goal for Birmingham on April 24, 2022, the game winner in a 2-1 victory over Loudoun United FC.

Detroit City
On 27 April 2022, Diop was traded to fellow USL Championship club Detroit City. Diop made his debut for Detroit City on May 7, 2022, during a 3-1 loss to FC Tulsa. He left Detroit following their 2022 season.

Career statistics

References

1995 births
Living people
Senegalese footballers
Senegalese expatriate footballers
Expatriate soccer players in the United States
Senegalese expatriate sportspeople in the United States
Association football forwards
Detroit City FC players
Diambars FC players
GNK Dinamo Zagreb players
Radford Highlanders men's soccer players
New York Red Bulls U-23 players
Atlanta United 2 players
Birmingham Legion FC players
USL Championship players
USL League Two players